The 2017 New Hampshire Wildcats football team represented the University of New Hampshire in the 2017 NCAA Division I FCS football season. They were led by 19th-year head coach Sean McDonnell and played their home games at Wildcat Stadium. They were a member of the Colonial Athletic Association. They finished the season 9–5, 5–3 in CAA play to finish in a tie for fourth place. They received an at-large bid to the FCS Playoffs where they defeated Central Connecticut and Central Arkansas before losing in the quarterfinals to South Dakota State.

Schedule

Game summaries

Maine

at Georgia Southern

at Holy Cross

Rhode Island

Bryant

at Stony Brook

Towson

at James Madison

at William & Mary

Elon

at Albany

NCAA First Round—Central Connecticut

NCAA Second Round—at Central Arkansas

NCAA Quarterfinal–at South Dakota State

Ranking movements

References

New Hampshire
New Hampshire Wildcats football seasons
New Hampshire
New Hampshire Wildcats football